Stefan Hugo Ernst Kaufmann (born 8 June 1948 in Ludwigshafen am Rhein) is a German immunologist and microbiologist and is one of the highly cited immunologists worldwide for the decade 1990 to 2000. He is amongst the 0.01% most cited scientists of ca. 7 million scientists in 22 major scientific fields globally.

Biography
Kaufmann is a German immunologist and microbiologist with focus on infection biology. He received his Dr. Rer. Nat. (PhD) at the University of Mainz in 1977 and his habilitation in immunology and microbiology at the Free University Berlin in 1981. He was professor at the University of Ulm from 1987 to 1998. Currently, he is director of the Department of Immunology at the Max Planck Institute for Infection Biology in Berlin, for which he served as founding director in 1993. Since 2019 he is director emeritus at this institute and leader of an emeritus group on systems immunology at the Max Planck Institute for Multidisciplinary Sciences. Member of the Max Planck Society since 1993. Since 1998 he is also professor for immunology and microbiology at the Charité Berlin. Since 2018 he is faculty fellow of the Hagler Institute for Advanced Study at Texas A&M University . He was appointed Senior Professor at Charité – Universitätsmedizin Berlin in September 2022.

Kaufmann collects historical medicinal books.

Career
Kaufmann has published more than 900 scientific original papers and review articles and according to the Clarivate – Web of Science, Highly Cited Researcher (category Immunologie) 2001, Highly Cited Researcher (category Cross-Field) 2020  he is one of the highly cited immunologists and vaccinologists with more than 90,000 citations (Google Scholar) worldwide for the decade 1990 to 2000 and has an h-index of 150 (as of October 2021). His current scientific interest is focused on the analysis of cell-mediated immunity against intracellular bacteria, the rational design and development of a better vaccine against tuberculosis as well as of biomarkers for reliable diagnosis of TB disease. Biomarker discovery is done in a multicentric approach with seven partner institutes in Africa with support from the Bill and Melinda Gates Foundation. His vaccine against tuberculosis is currently in phase III clinical trial assessment. A phase III vaccine trial to test prevention of tuberculosis recurrence (NCT 03152903) and a phase III trial to test prevention of tuberculosis disease in household contacts of tuberculosis patients are ongoing in India (CTRI/2019/01/017026). A third phase III trial to assess protection against tuberculosis in neonates (priMe) is currently ongoing at nine trial sites in five Sub-Saharan African countries (NCT 04351685) with financial support from the European Investment Bank. Moreover, for a clinical study assessing therapy of bladder cancer with the vaccine has revealed highly promising data (NCT 02371447). Furthermore, Kaufmann is actively involved in public awareness of immunology and infectious diseases (EFIS – Day of Immunology). In his recent books written in German, he has answered questions on Covid-19  and vaccination  in a detailed and comprehensible manner.

He is past president and honorary member of the German Society of Immunology (DGfI), past president of the European Federation of Immunological Societies (EFIS),  and past president of the International Union of Immunological Societies (IUIS). From 2010 to 2013 he was member of the board of the Global Alliance for Vaccines and Immunization (GAVI)  as alternate representative of scientific and technical institutes. From 2009 to 2014 he was a member of the advisory board of Global Alliance for TB Drug Development (TB Alliance) , New York. From 2014 to 2018 he was member of the strategic advisory committee of the European and Developing Countries Clinical Trials Partnership (EDCTP) . Kaufmann was member of the board of directors from 2003 to 2019 and of the scientific advisory council from 1998 to 2017 of the Robert Koch Foundation, which annually awards the Robert Koch Prize and the Robert Koch Medal in gold. Since 2014 he is chairman of the board of trustees of the Schering Foundation. From 2013 to 2014 he was corresponding member of the board of trustees and since 2014 he is full member of the board of trustees for the Lindau Nobel Laureate meetings for the Lindau Nobel Laureate Meetings. Since 2018 he is member of the Governance Board of the TuBerculosis Vaccine Initiative (TBVI) .

Kaufmann headed a team that developed a method of using defensins to combat anthrax.

Other activities
 Schering Foundation (Schering Stiftung), Chairman of the Board (since 2014)
 Lindau Nobel Laureate Meetings, Corresponding Member (2013–2014), Full Member of the Board of Trustees (since 2014)
 World Health Summit, Member of the Council 
 Berlin-Brandenburg Academy of Sciences :de:Berlin-Brandenburgische Akademie der Wissenschaften, Member
 German Academy of Sciences Leopoldina, Member
 American Academy of Microbiology, Member
 European Molecular Biology Organization (EMBO), Member
 Global Alliance for TB Drug Development (TB Alliance), Member of the Advisory Board (2009–2014)
Lindau Nobel Laureate Meetings, Member of the Council

Prizes and honours
Kaufmann has received numerous rewards and honours for his scientific achievements in immunology of infectious diseases including: 
 1982 – Förderpreis der Deutschen Gesellschaft für Hygiene und Mikrobiologie
 1987 – Alfried Krupp Award for young professors
 1988 – Aronson Prize of the State of Berlin
 1991 – Smith Kline Beecham Science Prize
 1991 – Merckle Science Prize
 1992 – Robert Pfleger Prizer
 1992 – Pettenkofer Prize
 1993 – Scientific Prize of the German Society for Hygiene and Microbiology
 2018 – Gagna A. & Ch. Van Heck Prize
 2022 – Ernst Hellmuth Vits Prize 2022 of Universitätsgesellschaft Münster 

In 2007, Kaufmann was conferred the title of Doctor Honoris Causa by the Université de la Mediterranée, Aix-Marseille II, France. In 2014 he received the Gardner Middlebrook Award. From 2014 to 2021, he was Fellow of the Royal College of Physicians of Edinburgh (FRCP Edin). He is Guest Professor, Tongji University, School of Medicine, Shanghai, China (since 2011), Honorary Professor, Universidad Peruana Cayetano Heredia, Lima, Peru (since 2012), and Visiting Professor, Peking Union Medical College, Beijing, China (since 2014).

Partial bibliography
The New Plagues: Pandemics and Poverty in a Globalized World, The Sustainability Project, Haus Publishing, London (2009)
Handbook of Tuberculosis, 3 Volume Set, Stefan H. E. Kaufmann (Editor), Paul van Helden (Editor), Eric Rubin (Editor), Warwick J. Britton (Editor), 
AIDS and Tuberculosis, A Deadly Liaison, Infection Biology Series, Kaufmann, Stefan H. E. / Walker, Bruce D. (Hrsg.),  – Wiley-VCH, Weinheim
The Immune Response to Infection, Stefan H.E. Kaufmann, Barry T. Rouse, David L. Sacks (Editors), ASM Press 2011
Tuberculosis, Stefan H.E. Kaufmann (Editor), Eric J. Rubin (Editor), Alimuddin Zumla (Editor), Cold Spring Harbor Laboratory Press
Tuberculosis vaccines: time for a global strategy. Sci. Transl. Med. 7: 276–8  (2015)

External links
  Translated into the following languages: Arabic, Chinese, Czech, Dutch, French, German, Italian, Portuguese, Russian, Spanish

Videos 
Latest Thinking: 

Latest Thinking:

References

German microbiologists
German immunologists
Living people
1948 births
Max Planck Institute directors
Johannes Gutenberg University Mainz alumni
Free University of Berlin alumni
People from Ludwigshafen